There are a number of passages in the Hebrew Bible that have been interpreted as involving same-sex sexual acts, desires, and relationships. The passages about homosexual individuals and sexual relations in the Hebrew Bible are found primarily in the Torah (the first five books traditionally attributed to Moses) and have been interpreted as referring primarily to male homosexual individuals and sexual practices.

Overview

The Hebrew Bible/Old Testament and its traditional interpretations in Judaism and Christianity have historically affirmed and endorsed a patriarchal and heteronormative approach towards human sexuality, favouring exclusively penetrative vaginal intercourse between men and women within the boundaries of marriage over all other forms of human sexual activity, including autoeroticism, masturbation, oral sex, non-penetrative and non-heterosexual sexual intercourse (all of which have been labeled as "sodomy" at various times), believing and teaching that such behaviors are forbidden because they're considered sinful, and further compared to or derived from the behavior of the alleged residents of Sodom and Gomorrah.

Genesis 19

Sodom and Gomorrah 
Genesis chapters 18 and 19 are concerned with the immorality of the cities of Sodom and Gomorrah and the judgement that must be imposed. The New International Version (NIV) of  reads:

Yada 
In Genesis 19:5 the Hebrew word "yada" is translated "relations" in the New American Standard Bible and most often "know" in the KJV and many other translations, occurs frequently in the Old Testament, and usually simply means to know someone or something in a non-sexual way. The common interpretation is that Lot offered his virgin daughters to the crowd as a means to sexually appease the crowd and protect his visitors from being raped. However, others see it as referring to Sodom's inhospitable attitude in seeking to interrogate the visitors.

Jewish views 
Most Jewish views regard the sins of Sodom to be "failing to practice hospitality", and even though same-sex activities are condemned most harshly in Leviticus, the opinion that Genesis 19 might refer to any other sexual act other than with Lot's daughters is alien to most ancient Jewish tradition.  See documentation at Sodomy.

Conversely, the Hellenistic Jewish philosopher Philo (20 BC – 50 AD)  described the inhabitants of Sodom in an extra-biblical account:

Additionally, the Jewish historian Josephus (AD 37 – c. 100) used the term “Sodomites” in summarizing the Genesis narrative:

The Book of the Secrets of Enoch, evidently written by a Hellenistic Jew in Egypt before the middle of the 1st century, states (10:3) that the Sodomites committed "abominable lecheries, namely one with another" and "the sin against nature, which is child-corruption after the Sodomitic fashion, magic-making, enchantments and devilish witchcraft."

More obscure sources include the Testament of Benjamin, which warned, "that ye shall commit fornication with the fornication of Sodom", (Concerning a Pure Mind, 9:1) and references in the Testament of Naphtal, (3.5) and the Testament of Isaac. (5.27. Ch. I.909)

Byzantine period 
It is argued that the story of Sodom and Gomorrah had never been interpreted as relating to one single particular sin, until Byzantine emperor Justinian the Great instituted two law novellizations, in the 6th century.
Regarding the Corpus iuris civilis, Justinian's novels no. 77 (dating 538) and no. 141 (dating 559) was the first to declare that Sodom's sin had been specifically same-sex activities. Regarding the death penalty, Justinian's legal novels heralded a change in the Roman legal paradigm by introducing the concept of not divine punishment for homosexual behavior. Individuals might escape mundane laws, however divine laws were inescapable.

Justinian's interpretation of the story of Sodom would be forgotten today (as it had been along with his law novelizations regarding homosexual behavior immediately after his death) had it not been made use of in fake Charlemagnian capitularies, fabricated by a Frankish monk using the pseudonym Benedictus Levita ("Benedict the Levite") around 850 CE, as part of the Pseudo-Isidore where Benedictus utilized Justinian's interpretation as a justification for ecclesiastical supremacy over mundane institutions, thereby demanding burning at the stake for carnal sins in the name of Charlemagne himself (burning had been part of the standard penalty for homosexual behavior particularly common in Germanic antiquity, note that Benedictus most probably was Frankish), especially homosexuality, for the first time in ecclesiastical history in order to protect all Christianity from divine punishments such as natural disasters for carnal sins committed by individuals, but also for heresy, superstition and heathenry. According to Benedictus, this was why all mundane institutions had to be subjected to ecclesiastical power in order to prevent moral as well as religious laxity causing divine wrath.

During the Roman Republic and pre-Christian Roman Empire, homosexual behavior had been acceptable as long as the adult male citizen took the penetrative role with a passive partner of lower social status. Laws regulating homosexuality were directed primarily at protecting underage male citizens. Those who committed a sex crime (stuprum) against a freeborn male minor were penalized by death or a fine, depending on the circumstances. Letters written to Cicero suggest that the law was used primarily to harass political opponents, and may have been applied also to citizens who willingly took the passive role in sex acts (see Sexuality in ancient Rome and Lex Scantinia).

Leviticus 18 and 20

These chapters of Leviticus form part of the Holiness code. Leviticus 18:22 says:

and Leviticus 20:13 states:

It is widely argued that the things condemned in these chapters are "deemed wrong not simply because pagan Canaanites indulged in them, but because God has pronounced them wrong as such." (Hilborn 2002, p. 4; cf. Issues in human sexuality, para. 2.11; Amsel). This was also the interpretation taken in the rabbinic interpretations in the Mishnah and Talmud, which also extended this to include female homosexual relations, although there are no explicit references in the Hebrew Bible to this.

Various counter-arguments have been suggested: Loren L. Johns writes that these texts were purity codes to keep Israel separate from the Canaanites and that as Jesus rejected the whole purity code they are no longer relevant. Mona West argues that "These verses in no way prohibit, nor do they even speak, to loving, caring sexual relationships between people of the same gender", speculating that these laws were to prevent sexual abuse. 

Other Christian theologians hold that the New Testament classifies ceremonial and dietary laws as typological in nature and fulfilled in Christ, and thus abrogated as to their religious observance "according to the letter," while the moral law is seen as upheld.  Such theologians have said that this abrogation does not extend to homosexuality, which remains in their interpretation as one of the few sins unconditionally condemned.  They believe there is no evident provision of marriage being given in the Bible to sanctify it.

Books of Samuel: David and Jonathan

The account of the friendship between David and Jonathan was recorded favourably in the Books of Samuel (1 Samuel 18; 20; 2 Samuel 1) and although most scholars have always interpreted it as referring to platonic, some have argued that it refers to romantic or sexual love.

As romantic relationship
Jonathan's gifts to David, David's comparison of Jonathan's love to the love of women, the "covenant" the two made, and Saul's reaction have led some scholars to suggest that  their relationship was a romantic or possibly sexual one.

As platonic relationship
Biblical scholars have widely and traditionally interpreted this as a very close but non-sexual relationship (cf. Issues in human sexuality, para. 2.17). Some opponents of the theory that David and Jonathan's relationship was romantic believe that the stripping of Jonathan has a clear Biblical precedent, that of the stripping of Aaron of his garments to put them upon Eleazar his son (Numbers 20:26) in transference of the office of the former upon the latter; in like manner, Jonathan would be symbolically and prophetically transferring the kingship of himself (as the normal heir) to David, which would come to pass.

Those who assert the opposing interpretation agree that a sexual relationship is not made explicit, and for many scholars the relationship is a "classical Biblical example" (Hilborn 2002, p. 2) of close non-sexual friendship, such as the friendship eloquently described by Gregory of Nazianzus in Oration 43, 19–20 as existing between him and Basil of Caesarea, when they were students in Athens.

Books of Kings
Both Books of Kings (1 Kings 14:24, 15:12, 22:46; 2 Kings 23:7), refer to historical intervals when kadeshim ("consecrated ones") rose to some prominence in the Holy Land, until purged by Jahwist revivalist kings such as Jehoshaphat and Josiah.

The kadeshim were connected in some way with the rituals of the Canaanite religion.  The Hebrew Bible consistently parallels the female equivalent, a kedeshah, with zanah, the word for a common prostitute.  This has led to the inference that there may have been a sexual element to the rituals.  The King James version systematically translates the word as "sodomites", while the Revised Standard version renders it, "male cult prostitutes".  At 1 Kings 15:12 the Septuagint hellenises them as teletai – personifications of the presiding spirits at the initiation rites of the Bacchic orgies.  There may have been a transvestite element too.  Various classical authors assert this of male initiates of Eastern goddess cults, and in the Vulgate for all four of these references St. Jerome renders the kadeshim as "effeminati".  The sons of Israel are forbidden from becoming kadeshim, and the daughters of Israel from becoming kadeshot, in Deuteronomy 23:17–18 their activities are identified as "abominations".

Book of Ruth

This book concerns the love between Naomi and her widowed daughter-in-law, Ruth. Naomi's husband and her two sons die and Naomi tells her daughters-in-law to return to their homes:
 (Ruth 1:14; TNIV).

Instead of leaving Naomi, Ruth pledges to stay with her (Ruth 1:16–18). This relationship has therefore long been commended as an example of self-sacrificing love and close friendship (e.g. Issues in Human Sexuality para. 2.7). However, some have interpreted this relationship as probably sexual in nature. For example, Thomas Horner argues: "Whether there existed a relationship of physical love between Ruth and Naomi cannot be demonstrated. However, the right words are there." The word Horner is primarily concerned with is the word translated as clung in Ruth 1:14, which is the Hebrew word "dabaq". This word is also translated in Genesis 2:24 as united "to his wife" and in Genesis 34:3 as drawn "to Dinah daughter of Jacob; he loved the young woman". The context of these passages is one of romantic or sexual attraction.

Text from the Book of Ruth, specifically Ruth's "whither thou goest, I will go" speech to Naomi, is used in Jewish heterosexual wedding ceremonies.

References

LGBT and Christianity
LGBT and Judaism
Religious law
Bible-related controversies
Hebrew Bible topics